DynaVenture Corp. was formed in 2000 by second generation family members Brian and Earl Eidem and Jo-Ann Thompson. Founding father Harold Eidem started the 60 year dynasty in 1948 in his Vancouver home with his first business Bearing and Transmission Supply (B&T). In 1973 Harold Eidem set up B&T Holdings Ltd to provide centralized services and act as the parent company to all of their business’ locations. In 1976, Harold Eidem died and the ownership of the company was transferred to his sons Brian and Earl Eidem and daughter Jo-Ann Thompson. In 1981, B&T Holdings changed its name to DynaVest Corp. to better indicate the new direction of the companies. In 2000, the Eidem family sold three major components of their holdings to Applied Industrial Technologies. 
 That same year the company would again change names, DynaVest became DynaVenture and the Eidem family have since increased their holdings in technology and engineering companies.

History
At the end of World War II in February 1948, Harold Eidem left a job at a bearing company to start Bearing and Transmission Supply out of his home in Vancouver British Columbia. One of Harold's first inventory purchases, from the U.S. Navy, was impounded at the Canadian/US border due to an $1800 Canadian customs bill. Having spent all of his savings on the inventory, Harold turned to his long-time friend Norman Hnatuk living in Saskatoon, Saskatchewan to pay the duty. Norman got the inventory out of the bond and became a partner in the Bearing and Transmission enterprise.

In November 1948 Norman Hnatuk officially joined Harold in Vancouver and one year later opened a second location in Saskatoon Saskatchewan. In 1950 the B&T Vancouver location was sold to Norman's brother Bill Hnatuk. Harold then joined Norm in Saskatoon where the two grew the company within Saskatchewan. The company has since expanded to have locations throughout North America.

Growth and acquisitions
1950s
B&T created formal distributorships with Hoover Ball and Bearing Co., Orange Roller Bearing Co., Morris Chain, Garlock, and SKF.
1956-B&T Ltd was incorporated
1957-Sales reached $356,000 doubling from 1956
1957-B&T Ltd.Regina was formed

1960s
1961-Convey IT a materials handling division is formed
1964-B&T was divided into two main divisions: Saskatoon and North Saskatchewan operated under Norm Hnatuk and Regina and South Saskatchewan operated under Harold Eidem
1965-B&T Prince Albert and Esterhazy were formed
1967-B&T Regina acquired Precision Bearings Company of Yorkton Saskatchewan

1970s
1970-B&T opened Estevan location to accommodate SaskPower coal fire electric power generating stations
1972-Curtis Hoover, a hydraulic (Vickers) distributor/service business in Saskatchewan was acquired, and consequently the company established a new operating unit with locations in Regina and Saskatoon named B&T Fluid Power Ltd.
1972-B&T Fluid Power Ltd. Prince George, British Columbia opened
1973-Harold Eidem purchased Norm Hnatuk interests in companies
1973-Harold Eidem formed B&T Holdings Ltd as parent company of Bearing & Transmission and B&T Fluid Power
1974-B&T Holdings purchased Hard Chrome Services in Regina
1976-B&T Holdings purchased Superior Hard Chrome Inc.in Saskatoon
1976-Bearing & Transmission Lloydminster Alberta opened
1976-Superior Hard Chrome opened a Regina location
1976-Harold Eidem died
1976-Brian and Earl Eidem and Jo-Ann Thompson the second generation take over reigns of company
1977-B&T Fluid Power opens a branch in Prince Albert
1979-B&T Fluid Power purchase Progressive Air & Hydraulics in Vancouver
1979-B&T Fluid Power open a Winnipeg location
1978-B&T opens Prince Albert, Saskatchewan location

1980s
1980-B&T Fluid Power form a partnership with H&M Fluid Power and open the first Alberta branch in Edmonton
1981-B&T Holdings changes name to DynaVest Corporation
1981-Convey IT locations open in Saskatoon and Regina, Saskatchewan
1982-B&T Fluid Power and all its past acquisitions changed their name to HyPOWER Systems.
1986-B&T Drayton Valley and Fort McMurray Alberta opens
1987-B&T Winnipeg Manitoba opens
1987-Convey-It WinnipegManitoba opened
1988-B&T Calgary, Lethbridge, Medicine Hat, and Peace River Alberta locations open

1990s
1990-B&T Rubber is formed in Regina
1992-All Agro Winnipeg opens
1991-HyPOWER Systems open a second Alberta branch in Calgary
1992-The Hydraulic division of Calgary Hose & Hydraulic was purchased and merged into the HyPOWER Calgary branch
1992-Fluid Clarification Inc formed with locations in Calgary, Edmonton and Vancouver
1994-Brian, Earl and Jo-Ann purchase Adanac Equipment in Delta British Columbia
1994-HyPOWER opens a location in Campbell River to supply fluid power products to the forest and marine industry on Vancouver Island
1995-B&T Grande Prairie opens
1996-All Agro Edmonton opens
1997-B&T Prince George and Kelowna, British Columbia open
1997-Campbell River, British Columbia opens the first B&T and HyPOWER combination branch
1998-B&T purchased the Sproule Bearings company with branches in Calgary, Lethbridge and Medicine Hat
1998-B&T branches open in Peace River, Alberta and Kamloops, British Columbia
1998-HyPOWER opens a Grande Prairie facility
1999-All Agro opens Saskatoon, Saskatchewan branch

2000s
2000-DynaVest sells Bearing & Transmission (B&T), All Agro and HyPOWER to Applied Industrial Technologies
2000-DynaVest changes name to DynaVenture Corp. to refine its purpose
2000-DynaVest purchased Belt Tech in Saskatoon and changed its name to B&T Rubber
2002-Superior Hard Chrome changes name to DynaIndustrial Inc.

References

External links 
DynaVenture Corp.'s Official Site

Manufacturing companies of Canada
Companies based in Saskatoon